The gens Satriena was an obscure plebeian family at ancient Rome.  No members of this gens obtained any of the higher offices of the Roman state, but a number are known from coins and inscriptions.

Origin
The nomen Satrienus belongs to a class of gentilicia formed from other nomina using the suffix -enus.  The root of the name is Satrius, the nomen of a more prominent gens.

Praenomina
The praenomina used by the Satrieni include Publius, Quintus, Gaius, and Lucius, four of the most common names throughout Roman history.

Branches and cognomina
The Satrieni used a variety of common surnames, including Pollio, a polisher, belonging to a class of cognomina derived from occupations; Salvia and Secunda, old praenomina that came to be regarded as surnames; Juvenalis, youthful, and perhaps Celsa, originally given to one who was particularly tall.

Members

 Satriena C. f., buried at Narbo in Gallia Narbonensis, together with Gaius Aemilius Philonicus and his wife, Aemilia Secunda.
 Satriena P. f., buried at Rome.
 Satrienus, named in an inscription from Aquinum in Latium.
 Lucius Satrienus C. f., named in an inscription from Aquinum.
 Publius Satrienus, as triumvir monetalis, minted coins bearing the head of Mars, or perhaps Pallas, on the obverse, and a she-wolf on the reverse.
 Quintus Satrienus Cosmus, named in an inscription from Rome.
 Satrienus Juvenalis, a military tribune in the eleventh legion, named in an inscription from the present site of Altenburg, formerly part of Germania Superior.
 Quintus Satrienus Pollio, named in a first-century inscription from Rome.
 Satriena P. l. Salvia, a freedwoman, and the wife of Quintus Pompeius Sosus, the freedman of Bithynicus, named in a funerary inscription from Rome.
 Satriena Q. l. Secunda, a freedwoman buried at Rome.

Footnotes

See also
 List of Roman gentes

References

Bibliography
 Joseph Hilarius Eckhel, Doctrina Numorum Veterum (The Study of Ancient Coins, 1792–1798).
 Dictionary of Greek and Roman Biography and Mythology, William Smith, ed., Little, Brown and Company, Boston (1849).
 Theodor Mommsen et alii, Corpus Inscriptionum Latinarum (The Body of Latin Inscriptions, abbreviated CIL), Berlin-Brandenburgische Akademie der Wissenschaften (1853–present).
 René Cagnat et alii, L'Année épigraphique (The Year in Epigraphy, abbreviated AE), Presses Universitaires de France (1888–present).
 George Davis Chase, "The Origin of Roman Praenomina", in Harvard Studies in Classical Philology, vol. VIII, pp. 103–184 (1897).
 Hermann Finke, "Neue Inschriften" (New Inscriptions), in Berichte der Römisch-Germanischen Kommission, vol. 17, pp. 1–107, 198–231 (1927).
 John C. Traupman, The New College Latin & English Dictionary, Bantam Books, New York (1995).

Roman gentes